Burgbernheim is a town in the Neustadt (Aisch)-Bad Windsheim district, in Bavaria, Germany. It has a population of around 3,300.

References

Neustadt (Aisch)-Bad Windsheim